Johann Nepomuk Hummel's Piano Concerto No. 2 in A minor, Op. 85 was written in 1816 and published in Vienna in 1821. Unlike his earlier piano concerti, which closely followed the model of Mozart's, the A minor concerto, like his Piano Concerto No. 3 in B minor, Op. 89, is written in a proto-Romantic style that anticipates the later stylistic developments of composers such as Frédéric Chopin, Franz Liszt and Felix Mendelssohn.

Date of composition and scoring 
The piano concerto was written by Hummel as a showcase for his virtuosity at the instrument. It was written in 1816 and is scored for piano, flute, two oboes, 2 clarinets, 2 bassoons, 2 horns, 2 trumpets, timpani, and strings.

Movements 

The work is composed in traditional three movement form. There is a solo transition in the second movement leading into the Rondo without pause.

 I. Allegro moderato
 II. Larghetto (in F major)
 III. Rondo: Allegro moderato

Influence
Although Hummel's music, seen as essentially Mozartian in style, had fallen out of fashion by the 1830s, the A minor concerto nonetheless exercised considerable influence over a number of works that helped to usher in the Romantic style. Frédéric Chopin, who had played the Hummel concerti, drew from elements of the A minor concerto in his own piano concerti. Indeed, it has been suggested that Chopin's concerto is closely linked both thematically and structurally to the Hummel antecedent.

The A minor concerto da camera of Charles-Valentin Alkan has also been noted for its debt to Hummel's style of writing for the keyboard.

While generally uninterested in Hummel as a composer, Robert Schumann had made a close study of the A minor concerto in 1828 and considered it one of the works (along with the F-sharp minor piano sonata) of his "heyday". And in his own A minor concerto, Schumann makes reference to aspects of Hummel's virtuosic style.

Notes

References
 M.F. Humphries, The Piano Concertos of Johann Nepomuk Hummel, PhD Dissertation (Northwestern University, 1957)
 B.H. Kim, Johann Nepomuk Hummel and His Contribution to Piano Music and the Art of Playing the Piano (University of Rochester, 1967)

External links
 

Compositions by Johann Nepomuk Hummel
Hummel 2
1816 compositions
Compositions in A minor